Xiannan may refer to:
Xiannan, seamount in the Zhongsha Islands
Xiannan, village in Tazhuang, Mishui, Hengdong, Hunan, China

See also
Xian'an District, Xianning, Hubei, China
Xiaonan District, Xiaogan, Hubei, China